Actinorhabdospora filicis is a bacterium from the genus Actinorhabdospora which has been isolated from soil in Tokyo, Japan.

References

External links
Type strain of Actinorhabdospora filicis at BacDive -  the Bacterial Diversity Metadatabase

Micromonosporaceae
Bacteria described in 2016
Monotypic bacteria genera